Ajjibettu  is a village in the southern state of Karnataka, India. It is located in the Bantval taluk of Dakshina Kannada district.

See also
 Dakshina Kannada
 Districts of Karnataka

References

External links
 http://Dakshina Kannada.nic.in/

Villages in Dakshina Kannada district